Cheikh Salim Fergani (Arabic الشيخ سليم فرقاني) (born 1953 in Constantine, Algeria) is an Algerian oud player and singer.

Career
He is a notable performer of ma'luf music, and has recorded various CDs for the Pneuma label of Eduardo Paniagua. He is the son of the Algerian musician Mohamed Tahar Fergani.

References

Oud players
1953 births
Living people
People from Constantine, Algeria
20th-century Algerian  male  singers
21st-century Algerian  male singers